Pointe-Verte is an community in Gloucester County, New Brunswick, Canada. It held village status prior to 2023.

History 
On 1 January 2023, Pointe-Verte amalgamated with Beresford, Nigadoo, Petit-Rocher, and all or part of ten local service districts to form the new town of Belle-Baie. The community's name remains in official use.

Geography 
Located on Chaleur Bay 30 km north of Bathurst, the village's main industry is lobster and scallop fishing, as well as forestry.

Demographics

Language

Notable people

See also
List of communities in New Brunswick

References

External links
 Village of Pointe-Verte

Communities in Gloucester County, New Brunswick
Former villages in New Brunswick